Jazz Boat is a 1960 British musical comedy film directed by Ken Hughes and starring Anthony Newley, Anne Aubrey, Lionel Jeffries and big band leader Ted Heath and his orchestra.

Many of the cast and the same director then made In the Nick (1960).

Plot
Electrician Bert Harris (Anthony Newley) boasts that he's a successful cat burglar, which leads to him getting mixed up with real thieves who need those special skills for a big jewellery heist. However, Bert was only giving them a "song and dance" about being a cat burglar, but now discovers it's too late to back out.

Cast
 Anthony Newley as  Bert Harris
 Anne Aubrey as  The Doll
 Bernie Winters as  The Jinx
 James Booth as  Spider Kelly
 Leo McKern as  Inspector
 Lionel Jeffries as  Sergeant Thompson
 David Lodge as  Holy Mike
 Al Mulock as  The Dancer
 Joyce Blair as  Rene
 Jean Philippe as  Jean
 Liam Gaffney as Spider's Father
 Henry Webb as Barman
 Ted Heath as  himself
 Frank Williams as Man whose bowler hat is knocked off in the market

Production
It was based on a novel by Rex Rienits. Rienits later admitted he disliked writing novels but was in a career slump so decided to write a novel to sell to the movies.

Filming started 15 June 1959. A scene involving more than 200 extras was shot at Chislehurst Caves, Kent; on that night the payroll was stolen meaning they could not be paid.

Critical reception
Variety called it "an odd assoilment of romance,  jazz, musical comedy and youthful  crimeas What comes out is largely chaos although some of it is infectiously amusing. Mostly it s vague, disjointed and purposeless. Director Ken Hughes may have been making some sort of an attempt at parodv of American crime pix."

The MFB called it "a lively, muddle headed British musical."
TV Guide wrote, "While imitating American gangster films, this simple picture also provides a look at the British "Teddy Boy" subcultureassome amusing situations, though none is particularly memorable"; while Leonard Maltin called it an "Energetic caper."

Filmink said it "starts out as a crime drama then weirdly turns into a musical (complete with dance numbers) then back into a crime drama again/"

References

External links
 
 Jazz Boat at Letterbox DVD
 

1960 films
British musical comedy films
1960s English-language films
Films directed by Ken Hughes
Films produced by Albert R. Broccoli
Columbia Pictures films
Films set in London
1960 musical comedy films
Films shot at MGM-British Studios
1960s British films